A. gouldi may refer to:

 Acalymma gouldi, a leaf beetle species found in North America
 Astacopsis gouldi, the Tasmanian giant freshwater crayfish, the largest freshwater invertebrate species in the world

See also

 Gouldi (disambiguation)